Winfried Bölke (25 May 1941 – 26 January 2021) was a German cyclist.

Career
He rode for West Germany. In 1963 he won the national championships and a bronze medal at the world championships in the road race for amateurs. Next year he turned professional and won the Tour de Picardie and one stage at the Volta a Catalunya. In 1965–1967 he won all national road race championships, as well as one madison title in 1967. In the following three years he won the road races of Maaslandse Pijl (1968), Saint-Raphael (1969), Kaistenberg (1970) and Porz (1970). He continued competing professionally until 1973.

References

1941 births
2021 deaths
German male cyclists
People from Genthin
Cyclists from Saxony-Anhalt
German cycling road race champions
20th-century German people